The Subcommittee on Civil Rights and Civil Liberties was a subcommittee within the United States House Committee on Oversight and Government Reform. It was dissolved for the 118th Congress after Republicans took control of the House of Representatives and James Comer became the full committee chairman.

Jurisdiction
The subcommittee had oversight jurisdiction over: issues related to civil rights, civil liberties and the equal protection of laws, including voting rights, freedom of religion, speech,
press, and assembly; equal employment; nondisclosure agreements; and criminal justice reform policies; and legislative and oversight jurisdiction over the Census Bureau and the Census.

Members, 117th Congress

Historical subcommittee rosters

116th Congress

References

External links
Subcommittee Homepage

Oversight Civil Rights
Government procurement in the United States